Gudenieki Parish is an administrative unit of Kuldīga Municipality in the Courland region of Latvia. The parish has a population of 798 (as of 1/07/2010) and covers an area of 112.3 km2.

Villages of Gudenieki parish 
 
 
 
  ( parish center )

References

External links 
 Gudenieki parish in Latvian

Parishes of Latvia
Kuldīga Municipality
Courland